North West FM (call sign: 3NOW) is a community radio station based in Hadfield, a suburb of north west Melbourne, Australia. Its broadcast area covers the City of Moreland, City of Hume and the City of Moonee Valley.

Extended coverage provides reception in the southern part of the Mitchell Shire, in particular to the suburbs of Donnybrook and Beveridge, along the Hume Highway, north of Craigieburn.

Programs 
North West FM presents a wide variety of programs. The nature of the station - being an open membership and participation driven community broadcast - provides for a mixture of music genre, spoken word topics, local sport and ethnic (non-English) languages.

A variety of religious programs are also present, considering the vast mix of immigrants from many parts of the world resident in the North Western region of Melbourne.

History 
Following a public meeting on 5 November 1987, the North West Community Radio Association was formally inaugurated and later incorporated in November 1988.
The radio station's first test transmission was made from the Broadmeadows TAFE College in November 1988.
The Department of Transport and Communications made a full-time licence available early in 1990.
This was one of eight sub-metropolitan licences issued on the same day to broadcasting groups in various Melbourne suburbs. North West FM applied for the North Western Melbourne area licence, there was no contest from other groups and its application was successful.
It took three years until permanent broadcasting commenced, when a transmitter licence was issued and full-time transmission commenced on 8 April 1993.

Website 
The North West FM website was launched in 2000. The website was re-developed and re-launched in 2005 and re-developed again, into its current version, on 19 April 2018.

New transmission site 
North West FM is upgrading and re-locating its transmitter (and associated equipment) as well as increasing the output power of the transmitted signal. The station's website says the changes will enable a stronger signal to better service the nominated licence area.

References

External links 
North West FM

Radio stations in Melbourne
Community radio stations in Australia
Radio stations established in 1993